The Ministry of Agriculture is responsible for government programs associated with agriculture in the province of Saskatchewan, Canada. William Richard Motherwell was the first Saskatchewan Minister of Agriculture from 1906-1917.

Branches
The ministry is composed of the following branches:
 Agriculture Research including running the Agriculture Development Fund, Agri-Value Program, and Strategic Research Program.
 Communications including published the AGRIVIEW newsletter.
 Corporate Services (internal administrative, financial and IT services)
 Crops
 Financial Programs (including Agricultural Credit Corporation of Saskatchewan, Livestock Loan Guarantee Program, Canada Advance Payment Program - Interest Rebate, Short-term Hog Loan Program, Meat Processing Investment Rebate Program, Canada-Saskatchewan SRM Management Program, Farm and Ranch Water Infrastructure Program, and Gopher Control Rebate Program.
 Irrigation
 Lands
 Livestock
 Policy
 Regional Services
 Saskatchewan Crop Insurance Corporation

References

External links
Ministry of Agriculture

Saskatchewan
Saskatchewan government ministries and agencies